Sarah Wildman is an American journalist, and non-fiction writer.

Life

Wildman is currently a staff editor and writer for Opinion at the New York Times.  She was a Milena Jesenska Journalism Fellow at the Institute for Human Sciences.
She won the Peter R. Weitz Prize from the German Marshall Fund. She was a senior correspondent for the American Prospect.
She was a visiting scholar at the Paul H. Nitze School of Advanced International Studies. Her work has appeared in The Forward, The Guardian, Slate, and The New Yorker. She is the author of Paper Love: The Search for the Girl My Grandfather Left Behind, a 'third generation' Holocaust memoir that "answers questions about how we can find new ways to talk about the Holocaust and its memory."

Speaking out about sexual harassment 

Wildman previously worked as assistant editor of The New Republic while Marty Peretz was the owner and editor. In 2017, she wrote that another editor Leon Wieseltier harassed her and that she was fired in retaliation for complaining: "In disclosing this incident to my superiors, the outcome was, in many ways, far worse than the act itself. It’s not exactly that I was disbelieved; it’s that in the end, I was dismissed", she wrote in Vox.

Wildman wrote that the sexual harassment went hand in hand with gender discrimination at the magazine during Peretz's tenure: "The women knew we had a far shallower chance of rising up the masthead than our male counterparts; all of us hoped we’d be the exception. To do so, we entered into a game in which the rules were rigged against us, sometimes pushing us well past our point of comfort in order to remain in play."

Works

References

External links

http://www.sarahwildman.com/
http://www.newrepublic.com/article/119888/sarah-wildmans-paper-love-excerpt
http://www.jewishbookcouncil.org/_blog/The_ProsenPeople/post/interview-sarah-wildman/

American women journalists
Living people
American women writers
Year of birth missing (living people)
21st-century American women
Sexual harassment journalism